Pagach (also Romanized as Pāgach) is a village in Manj Rural District, Manj District, Lordegan County, Chaharmahal and Bakhtiari Province, Iran. At the 2006 census, its population was 247, in 40 families. The village is populated by Lurs community.

References 

Populated places in Lordegan County
Luri settlements in Chaharmahal and Bakhtiari Province